A stun belt is a belt fastened around the subject's waist, leg, or arm that carries a battery and control pack, and contains features to stop the subject from unfastening or removing it. A remote-control signal is sent to tell the control pack to give the subject an electric shock. Some models are activated by the subject's movement.

The electrical pulse delivered by the control pack is based on the waveform developed by Jack Cover, which he called the TASER. 

These devices are used to control prisoners in the United States and elsewhere in the world. One type is the REACT belt (see below). Some stun belts can restrain the subject's hands and have a strap going under his groin to stop him from rotating the belt around his waist to reach its battery and control pack and trying to deactivate it. Stun belts are not generally available to the public.

REACT belt
The Remote Electronically Activated Control Technology belt is a make of stun belt. It is a restraining device that applies 50 kV to the muscles in the area of the kidneys, pulsed over 8 seconds. It is a product of Stun Tech Incorporated of Cleveland, Ohio. In March 2000, Stun Tech became Electronic Defense Technology, LLC, which later became Stinger Systems, Inc. In the fall of 2010, the assets of Stinger Systems (including the REACT system) were purchased by Karbon Arms. The Band-It and Ice Shield (electrified riot shield) continue to be produced, sold by, and serviced by StunTronics LLC. The REACT belt is remote control-activated, with a range of up to 200–300 feet (60–90 meters).

The REACT belt is no longer available from Stinger systems, having been replaced with a device which attaches to the arm or leg called the Band-It.

Introduced in the United States in the early 1990s, by 1996 it was reportedly in use by the Federal Bureau of Prisons, the U.S. Marshals Service, and 16 state correctional agencies including those of Alaska, California, Colorado, Delaware, Florida, Georgia, Kansas, Ohio, Virginia, and Washington. It is also used during judicial hearings (e.g., in 1998, against Ronald Hawkins in Los Angeles, California for frequently interrupting Judge Joan Comparet-Cassani at a sentencing hearing).

In 1996, Amnesty International called on the USA to ban the use and export of the machine, arguing that it is a torture device that is "in direct contravention of international standards on the treatment of prisoners". Since then, the United States has not complied with the organization's request. Presently, the U.S. and South Africa are the only two countries that still use the stun belt.

See also 
 Graduated Electronic Decelerator
 Taser

External links
Cruelty in Control summarises some of the suits against the device including patent infringements
 Barry Yeoman, Shocking Discipline, Mother Jones
 http://www.progressive.org/mag_cusactech
 http://www.stuntronics.com/ice-shield-1.html

Non-lethal weapons
Police weapons
Physical restraint
Instruments of torture